James Curtis Atkins (born January 28, 1970) is a former professional American football offensive lineman playing seven seasons for the Seattle Seahawks, the Baltimore Ravens, and the Detroit Lions.

1970 births
Living people
People from Amite City, Louisiana
Players of American football from Louisiana
American football offensive guards
American football offensive tackles
Louisiana Ragin' Cajuns football players
Seattle Seahawks players
Baltimore Ravens players
Detroit Lions players